Chabulina putrisalis is a moth in the family Crambidae. It was described by Viette in 1958. It is found on the Comoros (Grande Comore) and Seychelles (Cosmoledo, Aldabra, Menai).

References

Moths described in 1958
Spilomelinae